Vessy may refer to:

People
Robert Vessy (died 1430), English politician and Member of Parliament

Places
 Vessy, a locality within the municipality of Veyrier in the Canton of Geneva, Switzerland

See also
Vess
Vessey (disambiguation)
Vesy
Vesey